"Call Me" is a song by American singer Tweet from her debut studio album, Southern Hummingbird (2002). It was written by Tweet and Missy Elliott, and produced by Timbaland. The song was released on April 22, 2002, as the album's second single. "Call Me" reached number 31 on the Billboard Hot 100 and number nine on Billboards Hot R&B/Hip-Hop Songs, becoming Tweet's second consecutive top-10 entry on the latter chart.

The accompanying music video was directed by Chris Robinson and released in May 2002. The song was used in television ads for Verizon Wireless' Freeup prepay wireless service in 2002.

Track listings
German CD maxi single 1
 "Call Me" (original version) – 2:56
 "Call Me" (Soul Society Remix) – 2:57
 "Call Me" (C.L.A.S.N.O.D.G. Remix) – 3:43
 "Oops (Oh My)" (live in Munich) – 3:38
 "Call Me" (video) – 2:58

UK 12-inch single
A1. "Call Me" (C&J Radio Mix) – 3:05
A2. "Call Me" (LP version) – 2:56
B1. "Call Me" (P. Diddy Remix) – 4:13
B2. "Call Me" (P. Diddy Remix instrumental) – 4:13

German CD maxi single 2 and UK CD single
 "Call Me" (C&J Radio Mix) – 3:05
 "Call Me" (P. Diddy Remix) (featuring the Hoodfellaz) – 4:13
 "Call Me" (LP version) – 2:56
 "Call Me" (video) – 2:58

Australian CD single
 "Call Me" (album version) – 2:56
 "Oops (Oh My)" (C&P Radio Edit) – 4:00
 "Get Away (Move On)" – 4:22
 "Call Me" (instrumental) – 3:35

German 12-inch single
A1. "Call Me" (original version) – 2:58
A2. "Call Me" (Soul Society Remix) – 2:57
A3. "Call Me" (C.L.A.S.N.O.D.G. Remix) – 3:43
A4. "Call Me" (C&J Radio Mix) – 3:05
A5. "Call Me" (P. Diddy Remix) – 4:13
B1. "Call Me" (original version instrumental) – 3:35
B2. "Call Me" (Soul Society Remix instrumental) – 2:54
B3. "Call Me" (C.L.A.S.N.O.D.G. Remix instrumental) – 3:43
B4. "Call Me" (C&J Radio Mix instrumental) – 3:09
B5. "Call Me" (P. Diddy Remix instrumental) – 4:09

Credits and personnel
Credits adapted from the liner notes of Southern Hummingbird.

 Tweet – vocals
 Timbaland – production
 Jimmy Douglass – engineering, mixing
 Bernie Grundman – mastering

Charts

Weekly charts

Year-end charts

Release history

References

2002 singles
2002 songs
Elektra Records singles
Music videos directed by Chris Robinson (director)
Song recordings produced by Timbaland
Songs written by Missy Elliott
Songs written by Tweet (singer)
Tweet (singer) songs